Tim Caldwell may refer to:

Tim Caldwell (skier) (born 1954), American cross country skier
Tim Caldwell (cricketer) (1913–1994), Australian cricketer, chairman of the Australian Cricket Board and banker